Alexander George Atty (December 8, 1916 – May 3, 1973) was an American football offensive lineman in the National Football League for the Cleveland Rams. He played one season in 1939, and was drafted out of West Virginia in 1939. He is also listed on the all-time roster of the Detroit Lions as a guard in 1941. He was born in Johnstown, Pennsylvania.

Atty graduated with a Master of Science degree from West Virginia in 1940, and earned a Doctor of Education from Pennsylvania State University in 1964.

References

External links
Alex Atty's profile at databasefootball
Obituary listing

1916 births
1973 deaths
Sportspeople from Johnstown, Pennsylvania
Players of American football from Pennsylvania
American football offensive guards
West Virginia Mountaineers football players
Cleveland Rams players
West Virginia University alumni
Penn State College of Education alumni
Detroit Lions players